Ilvar-e Panj Dangeh (also Romanized as Īlvār-e Panj Dāngeh) is a village in Sadan Rostaq-e Gharbi Rural District, in the Central District of Kordkuy County, Golestan Province, Iran. At the 2006 census, its population was 442, in 119 families.

References 

Populated places in Kordkuy County